Bamboutos FC is a Cameroonian football club based in Mbouda and founded in 1966. They are a member of the Cameroonian Football Federation.  Their home stadium is Stade de Mbouda.

Honours
 Cameroon Première Division: 3 

 Cameroon Cup: 4

Super Coupe Roger Milla: 6

Unifac Clubs Cup: 10
 2004.

Performance in CAF competitions
CAF Confederation Cup: 1 appearance
2005 – Second Round of 16

External links
Official site

Football clubs in Cameroon
Association football clubs established in 1966
1966 establishments in Cameroon
Sports clubs in Cameroon